Raney Peak is a symmetrical peak rising to  between Rim Glacier and Sprocket Glacier, Victoria Land. It was named by the Advisory Committee on Antarctic Names in 2007 after Michele E. Raney, who was a physician with the 1979 winter party at Amundsen–Scott South Pole Station. She was the first female to winter at an Antarctic inland station.

References

Mountains of Victoria Land